Empogona is a genus of flowering plants in the family Rubiaceae. The genus is found in tropical and southern Africa and Madagascar. It was for a time deemed a subgenus or section of Tricalysia.

Species

 Empogona acidophylla (Robbr.) Tosh & Robbr.
 Empogona aequatoria (Robbr.) Tosh & Robbr.
 Empogona africana (Sim) Tosh & Robbr.
 Empogona aulacosperma (Robbr.) Tosh & Robbr.
 Empogona bequaertii (De Wild.) Tosh & Robbr.
 Empogona bracteata (Hiern) Tosh & Robbr.
 Empogona breteleri (Robbr.) Tosh & Robbr.
 Empogona buxifolia (Hiern) Tosh & Robbr.
 Empogona buxifolia subsp. australis (Robbr.) Tosh & Robbr.
 Empogona buxifolia subsp. buxifolia
 Empogona cacondensis (Hiern) Tosh & Robbr.
 Empogona concolor (N.Hallé) Tosh & Robbr.
 Empogona congesta (Oliv.) J.E.Burrows
 Empogona coriacea (Sond.) Tosh & Robbr.
 Empogona crepiniana (De Wild. & T.Durand) Tosh & Robbr.
 Empogona deightonii (Brenan) Tosh & Robbr.
 Empogona discolor (Brenan) Tosh & Robbr.
 Empogona filiformistipulata (De Wild.) Bremek.
 Empogona filiformistipulata subsp. epipsila (Robbr.) Tosh & Robbr.
 Empogona filiformistipulata subsp. filiformistipulata
 Empogona glabra (K.Schum.) Tosh & Robbr.
 Empogona gossweileri (S.Moore) Tosh & Robbr.
 Empogona jenniferae Cheek
 Empogona kirkii Hook.f.
 Empogona kirkii subsp. junodii (Schinz) Tosh & Robbr.
 Empogona kirkii subsp. kirkii
 Empogona lanceolata (Sond.) Tosh & Robbr.
 Empogona macrophylla (K.Schum.) Tosh & Robbr.
 Empogona maputensis (Bridson & A.E.van Wyk) Tosh & Robbr.
 Empogona ngalaensis (Robbr.) Tosh & Robbr.
 Empogona nogueirae (Robbr.) Tosh & Robbr.
 Empogona ovalifolia (Hiern) Tosh & Robbr.
 Empogona ovalifolia var. glabrata (Oliv.) Tosh & Robbr.
 Empogona ovalifolia var. ovalifolia
 Empogona ovalifolia var. taylorii (S.Moore) Tosh & Robbr.
 Empogona reflexa (Hutch.) Tosh & Robbr.
 Empogona reflexa var. ivorensis (Robbr.) Tosh & Robbr.
 Empogona reflexa var. reflexa
 Empogona somaliensis (Robbr.) Tosh & Robbr.
 Empogona talbotii (Wernham) Tosh & Robbr.
 Empogona welwitschii (K.Schum.) Tosh & Robbr.

References

Empogona
Rubiaceae genera
Taxa named by Joseph Dalton Hooker